The Shot in the Pavilion (German: Der Schuß im Pavillon) is a 1925 German silent mystery film directed by Max Obal and starring Ernst Reicher, Margarete Schlegel and Helena Makowska. It features the popular detective character Stuart Webbs who appeared in a number of silent films.

It was made at the Emelka Studios in Munich and released by Bavaria Film. The film's sets were designed by the art director Ludwig Reiber.

Cast
 Ernst Reicher as Stuart Webbs, Detektiv  
 Margarete Schlegel 
 Helena Makowska
 Josef Berger 
 Friedl Haerlin 
 Georg Henrich 
 Manfred Koempel-Pilot
 Ferdinand Martini 
 Siegfried Raabe

References

Bibliography
 Grange, William. Cultural Chronicle of the Weimar Republic. Scarecrow Press, 2008.

External links

1925 films
1925 mystery films
German mystery films
Films of the Weimar Republic
Films directed by Max Obal
German silent feature films
Films shot at Bavaria Studios
Bavaria Film films
German black-and-white films
Silent mystery films
1920s German films